Mehdi Méniri (born 29 June 1977) is a former professional footballer who played as a defender. Born in France, he represented Algeria at international level.

Club career
Born in Metz, Méniri first played senior football for AS Nancy. He moved on to Troyes AC, with whom he played in the UEFA Cup after helping them become one of the winners of the 2001 UEFA Intertoto Cup, and in the summer of 2003 he finally went to play for FC Metz.

After three seasons with FC Metz he signed with SC Bastia in Ligue 2. At the end of the 2007–08 season, he was loaned out to Qatari club Al Khor for three months. He returned to Bastia after his loan spell.

On 31 March 2010, Méniri signed a season-long contract with Al Dhafra Club.

On 16 September 2010, it was announced that Meniri was joining French amateur side CSO Amnéville.

International career
Méniri made his debut for the Algeria national team in a friendly against Bulgaria on 14 November 2000.

Career statistics

Scores and results list Algeria's goal tally first, score column indicates score after each Méniri goal.

Honours
Troyes
UEFA Intertoto Cup: 2001

References

External links
 

1977 births
Living people
Sportspeople from Metz
Association football defenders
French footballers
Algerian footballers
Algeria international footballers
AS Nancy Lorraine players
ES Troyes AC players
FC Metz players
SC Bastia players
Al Dhafra FC players
Al-Khor SC players
CSO Amnéville players
Ligue 1 players
Ligue 2 players
Qatar Stars League players
UAE Pro League players
French sportspeople of Algerian descent
Algerian expatriate footballers
Algerian expatriate sportspeople in the United Arab Emirates
Expatriate footballers in Qatar
Expatriate footballers in the United Arab Emirates
Algerian expatriate sportspeople in Qatar
French expatriate footballers
French expatriate sportspeople in Qatar
French expatriate sportspeople in the United Arab Emirates